The Darling of New York is a 1923 American silent comedy film directed by King Baggot and written by Adrian Johnson and Raymond L. Schrock. The film stars Baby Peggy, her first feature film. The film was released on December 3, 1923, by Universal Pictures. In the film, Baby Peggy plays Santussa, who after she is taken by a gang of jewel smugglers is able to reform them.

Plot
As described in a film magazine review, Italian orphan Santussa is sent to New York City to be cared by for her grandfather. Accompanying Santussa is her Governess. In order to protect themselves and perhaps collect a large ransom, a gem smuggler separates her from her Governess and steals little Baby Peggy. Some stolen gems have been secreted in the clothes of a little rag doll which Baby Peggy has with her, and she is kidnapped from the Italian pier by the gem smuggler. She is cast in with the gang of smugglers at their hideout in New York City's Lower East Side, an immigrant, working-class neighborhood, and goes through a great number of harrowing experiences. Through her actions, members of the gang become reformed and Santussa is finally restored to her family.

Cast

Preservation
This film is presumed to be a lost film with only the last reel, which shows the fire destroying the smugglers' hideout, surviving at the UCLA Film and Television Archive.

See also
List of incomplete or partially lost films

References

External links

The Darling of New York at silentera.com

1923 films
1920s English-language films
Silent American comedy films
1923 comedy films
Universal Pictures films
Films directed by King Baggot
American black-and-white films
Lost American films
American silent feature films
1923 lost films
Lost comedy films
1920s American films